Baby Vox Re.V (name variations include BABYVOX Re.V and Baby V.O.X Re.V) was a K-pop music group, being the descendant group of Baby V.O.X. The group's subtitle "Re.V" stands for Renaissance Voices. Baby Vox Re.V was revealed on December 26, 2006, and like the original group, there is one lead vocalist, three "sub-vocalists", and a singer/rapper.

History

Debut
The group made its debut in January 2007 with the lead single "Shee". Around the same time, rival groups Cats and Wonder Girls also made their debuts. Compared to the other groups, however, Baby Vox Re.V has a more mature, sexual image, much like the original Baby V.O.X. For example, the group encountered some minor controversy when parts of the choreography for "Shee" was found to be too sexual.

KBS has reported that member Myung Sa Rang left the group in order to continue school in Singapore and will be there for at least one year. Han Aeri has also left, in hopes for a career in acting. They were later replaced by two new members, Oh Min Jin and Park So Ri. Oh Min Jin has had prior experience in the industry, being part of the Japanese band Zenith; Park Sori is a newcomer, born in Gangneung, South Korea. The two have reportedly been brought in for their distinct looks, as Oh has a "sexy" look while Park has a cute appeal. The two new members have been training since Spring 2007, in order to prepare for the group's Asia-wide promotional tour. The revamped Baby VOX Re.V made their debut in a Thailand showcase. Since then, the group has performed in many events such as the Korea-China Song Festival, SBS Super Concert and KBS' New Year's Live Broadcast. They also had a concert during a promotional trip in Cambodia.

Baby Vox Re.V visited and performed in Mongolia in May 2007.

Second album comeback
The second album was released on July 11, 2008, with the first single being "I Believe". They performed their first live comeback performance on July 12, 2008 at MBC Music Core.

Presently
Yang Eun Ji announced that she has left the group and will be quitting the industry to get married while leader An Jin Kyoung had gone on to pursue a career as a solo artist. The group had been disbanded though there were no official news of it.

Former Baby VOX Re.V member Hwang Yeon Kyung will wed her choreographer boyfriend in October after five years of dating. Hwang used her Facebook to alert fans, saying, "The date has been set. The wedding will be on Oct. 21".

Former members
 An Jin-kyoung
 Yang Eun-ji
 Hwang Yeon-kyoung
 Oh Min-jin
 Park So-ri
 Han Ae-ri
 Myung Sa-rang

Discography
Baby Vox Re.V (2007)
Baby Vox (2008)

References

External links
 Official Cafe 

South Korean girl groups
South Korean dance music groups
K-pop music groups
Musical groups established in 2007
Musical groups disestablished in 2009
2007 establishments in South Korea
2009 disestablishments in South Korea